Park Sang-hyun (born 24 April 1983) is a South Korean professional golfer. Since 2014 Park has played primarily on the Japan Golf Tour, where he has two wins, in 2016 and 2019.

Before 2014 Park played on the Korean Tour, his first wins coming in 2009. He finished third behind Lee Westwood and Miguel Ángel Jiménez in the 2011 Ballantine's Championship, an event co-sanctioned with the European Tour and the Asian Tour. Park continues to play on the Korean Tour, where he has won a total of eight times, including the GS Caltex Maekyung Open in 2016 and 2018. He finished runner-up in the 2018 Kolon Korean Open, one of the Open Qualifying Series events, to gain entry to the 2018 Open Championship, his first major championship. Park was runner-up in the 2018 Asian Tour Order of Merit giving him a place in the 2019 WGC-Mexico Championship.

Professional wins (13)

Japan Golf Tour wins (2)

Japan Golf Tour playoff record (0–2)

Asian Tour wins (2)

1Co-sanctioned by the Korean Tour

Asian Tour playoff record (1–0)

OneAsia Tour wins (1)

1Co-sanctioned by the Korean Tour

OneAsia Tour playoff record (1–0)

Korean Tour wins (11)

1Co-sanctioned by the OneAsia Tour
2Co-sanctioned by the Asian Tour

Results in major championships
Results not in chronological order before 2019.

CUT = missed the half-way cut
"T" = tied

Results in World Golf Championships

"T" = Tied
WD = withdrew

References

External links

South Korean male golfers
Japan Golf Tour golfers
1983 births
Living people